Nick Peros (born March 17, 1963) is a Canadian classical composer whose catalogue of works includes symphonic, orchestral, choral, vocal, and chamber works. He is a published author and a poet.

Early life 
Peros was born in Toronto, Ontario, and received his first guitar at age six. He began serious study of the instrument at age eleven, focusing primarily on rock and blues genres. While in his teens Peros discovered classical music and composition, enrolling in formal studies of Theory and Composition with Dr. Tony Dawson at the Royal Conservatory of Music's ARCT program in Toronto from 1987 to 1989. Peros is a graduate of the University of Toronto (BSc).

Compositions & recordings 
Peros' catalogue of works includes compositions for a cappella chorus, accompanied solo voice, solo instrumental works, as well as chamber and orchestral works. He has released four recordings to date.

Vocal 
Peros' vocal works are primarily songs for solo voice and piano and are settings of various poetic texts, including texts by Emily Bronte, William Blake, Emily Dickinson, A.E. Housman, William Wordsworth, Robert Louis Stevenson, et al. His CD Songs (Phoenix Records, 2000), performed by soprano Heidi Klann and pianist Alayne Hall, features 31 songs for voice and piano, 17 of which are settings of the poetry of Emily Bronte, with a number of those being the first time Bronte's poems have been set to music.

Choral 
Peros' choral works focus largely on a cappella motets, composed for two to five part chorus and characterized by both homophonic and polyphonic textures. Peros' debut CD Motets (Phoenix Records 1999), features a selection of 20 motets performed by The Renaissance Singers, conducted by Richard Cunningham. The Motets received their world premiere performance on September 24, 1999 at Toronto's George Weston Recital Hall, performed by The Renaissance Singers, conducted by Richard Cunningham.

Prayer of Consolation is a large-scale a cappella choral work in eleven movements composed to mark the First Anniversary of 9/11.  Featuring a Biblical text compiled by Peros to reflect a dialogue between God and Man on the events of 9/11, Prayer of Consolation received its world premiere on September 10, 2002, in Washington D.C. at Washington National Cathedral, performed by The Palestrina Choir, conducted by Michael Harrison, as part of the U.S. commemorations of the first anniversary of 9/11.

Solo Instrumental 
Peros' compositions for solo instrument include works for flute, cello, harp, piano and guitar. Soliloquies (Phoenix Records, 2012) features a selection of works for solo instrument, including Eden, for solo flute, Suite No.1 for Solo Cello and five Poemes for Solo Piano.  Select Poemes for Solo Piano were recorded by Canadian pianist Linda Shumas and included on her recording Paradise Reborn .

Compositions for solo guitar include 24 Nocturnes for Solo Guitar, Sonata for Solo Guitar, Rondo for Solo Guitar and five Suites for Solo Guitar. Nocturnes: 24 Nocturnes for Solo Guitar (DeoSonic Music, 2017) was the world premiere recording of the 24 nocturnes and was performed and recorded by Canadian guitarist Michael Kolk. The 24 Nocturnes and the Rondo for Solo Guitar are published by Les Productions D'Oz.

Chamber and Orchestral 
Peros' chamber works include a Sonata for Cello and Piano, various duets, and music for string trio. His orchestral works include Prelude to Beren & Luthien, a one-movement work for full orchestra inspired by the Tolkien story, and Northern Lights. Northern Lights (1993) is a one-movement orchestral work which received its world premiere in November 1994, performed by Symphony Hamilton, conducted by Clyde Mitchell. In 1997 Northern Lights was further performed across Canada, including a performance by the Regina Symphony Orchestra, conducted by Marc David, which was recorded and broadcast nationally by CBC Radio. Most recently Northern Lights was performed by the Arcady Ensemble under the direction of Ronald Beckett.

Producer 
Peros is also a music producer.  His CD O Canada – A Canadian Celebration (Peros Music, 2002) is both Certified platinum and Certified gold, while the CDs Home for Christmas (Peros Music, 2004), HomeGrown (Peros Music, 2005) and Stories from Home (Peros Music, 2005) are Certified gold.

Writings 
As an author, Peros' writings focus on theological subjects of Christian truth.  His book What Happened on the Cross (Wipf & Stock, 2020) presents a new understanding of atonement, showing the Penal Substitution view as being without a biblical basis.

As a poet, he writes primarily in the form of the contemporary sonnet. The Inextinguishable Light (DeoSonic Press, 2020) is a collection of 150 of Peros' sonnets. In terms of form and structure, the sonnets follow the general sonnet form of fourteen lines, an overall rhyme scheme and the transitional volta moment, but in regards to rhythm, stress and metre, Peros employs Syllabic Accentual Verse rather than the traditional iambic pentameter.

References

External links
 Nick Peros official website

21st-century classical composers
Living people
1963 births
Male classical composers
21st-century male musicians